Klas Magnus Söderman (born 9 May 1977) is a Swedish far-right activist and fascist who is a former spokesman of the Nordic Resistance Movement.

Biography 

In May 2015, Söderman was one of the Swedish people sanctioned by Russia during the Russo-Ukrainian War.

On 18 March 2021, he became one of the organizers of the anti-COVID-19 pandemic lockdown protest in Sweden, and had explained: "Those who want these societal changes are dangerous people. They will not settle for a little, they want everything. Total control. This is what people are protesting against in Europe - sometimes with violence as a result. I can do nothing but give them my support." 

On 20 May 2021, he was one of the organizers of an antisemitic protest rally during the Israeli-Palestinian conflict.

On 26 October 2021, Det fria Sverige, DFS, held a digital membership meeting where the issue of regrowth was on the agenda, as Chairman Dan Eriksson, and Söderman were present to inform members about the plans to start a youth department.

Söderman authored the novel The Defiant One, the plot of which revolves around a young white woman whose Swedish high school is composed mainly of Blacks and Muslims.

References 

1977 births
Living people
Far-right politics in Sweden
Swedish fiction writers
Swedish male writers
COVID-19 conspiracy theorists
Swedish fascists